Joseph Anschutz, or Joseph Anshutz, was an American architect who designed schools in the Philadelphia, Pennsylvania area.

He designed approximately 75 schools, some nearly identical.

Works designed or co-designed by Anschutz that have been listed on the U.S. National Register of Historic Places include:

listed as Joseph Anschutz or Joseph W. Anschutz

George W. Childs School, 1501 S. 17th St., Philadelphia PA
Watson Comly School, 13250 Trevose Rd., Philadelphia PA
Francis M. Drexel School, 1800 S. Sixteenth St., Philadelphia PA
William Levering School, 5938 Ridge Ave., Philadelphia PA
James Martin School, 3340 Richmond St., Philadelphia PA
Philip H. Sheridan School, 800–818 E. Ontario St., Philadelphia PA

listed as Joseph W. Anshutz or J.W. Anshutz or Joseph Anshutz

Germantown Grammar School (Boundary Increase), 45 W. Haines St., Philadelphia PA
Francis Scott Key School, 2226–2250 S. Eighth St., Philadelphia PA
David Landreth School, 1201 S. Twenty-third St., Philadelphia PA
The Landreth School has been redeveloped.
Thomas Powers School, Frankford Ave. and Somerset St., Philadelphia PA

An early 20th-century article that uses the "Anshutz" spelling says he also co-designed Philadelphia's Central High School.

See also
Louis Anshutz, an architect who designed two NRHP-listed Philadelphia schools

References

20th-century American architects